The John Otto Spannring Family Farm, in Sweet Grass County, Montana about  east Big Timber, includes structures dating as far back as 1917. The farm was listed on the National Register of Historic Places in 1995.

The property includes two sections fronting along the northeast side of the Yellowstone River, the longer of which is fertile bottom lands, historically and currently used for hay-making, running for about  along the river.  The farm includes fields, pasture, meadows, coulees and rock outcroppings, on the edge of a broad plateau.

The principal farm house was built in 1920 by John Otto Spannring and his four sons.  It is a one-and-a-half-story stone and
frame bungalow. It was modified in 1924, 1928, the early 1930s, and during 1988 to 1991.

References

Farms on the National Register of Historic Places in Montana
National Register of Historic Places in Sweet Grass County, Montana
Buildings and structures completed in 1917
1917 establishments in Montana
Historic districts on the National Register of Historic Places in Montana
Bungalow architecture in Montana